Jadwiga Smosarska (23 September 1898 – 1 November 1971) was a Polish film actress. She appeared in more than 25 films between 1919 and 1937, as well as various stage productions.

Biography
Smosarska was known for playing characters representative of Polish clichés that reflected the suffering of the country's citizens. Patriotic, romantic and in good social standing, her characters often struggled with malaise and a tragic love life. In the 1920s she rose to fame in Poland as one of Sfinks Film Studio's leading stars after Pola Negri left the country for Germany.

Smosarska fled Warsaw in 1939, seeking refuge in Lithuania before securing passage by boat to the United States through Scandinavia. Though she attempted to establish a career in Hollywood, her accent proved too much of a challenge for American film makers. In 1954 Smosarska toured parts of Canada to help raise money for welfare projects aimed at assisting Polish immigrants. Sponsored by Toronto's Advance Film Service, the trip began at Eaton Auditorium on 6 March, before stops in London, Hamilton, Ottawa, Montreal, Oshawa, Wellington and Brantford. She remained in the United States until 1970, before returning to live the final year of her life in Poland.

Selected filmography
 The Unspeakable (1924)
 Trędowata (1926)
 Exile to Siberia (1930)
 Księżna Łowicka (1932)
 Prokurator Alicja Horn (1933)
 Barbara Radziwiłłówna (1936)
 Jadzia (1936)
 Ułan Księcia Józefa (1937)

References

External links

1898 births
1971 deaths
Actresses from Warsaw
Burials at Powązki Cemetery
People from Warsaw Governorate
Polish film actresses
Polish stage actresses
Polish silent film actresses
20th-century Polish actresses